Zoologica Scripta is a bimonthly peer-reviewed scientific journal on systematic zoology, published by Wiley-Blackwell on behalf of the Norwegian Academy of Science and Letters and the Royal Swedish Academy of Sciences. It was established in 1972. The current chief editor is Per Sundberg. According to the Journal Citation Reports, the journal has a 2020 impact factor of 3.140, ranking it 12th out of 174 journals in the category "Zoology".

See also 
 Arkiv för Zoologi

References

External links 
 
 

Zoology journals
Royal Swedish Academy of Sciences
Publications established in 1972
Bimonthly journals
Wiley-Blackwell academic journals
Academic journals associated with learned and professional societies